Alycia J. Weinberger is a staff member at the Carnegie Institution of Washington. Before joining the Carnegie scientific staff in 2001, she was a Near Infrared Camera and Multi-Object Spectrometer (NICMOS) postdoctoral researcher and astrobiology postdoctoral fellow at University of California, Los Angeles (UCLA). She received her B.A. in Physics from the University of Pennsylvania and her PhD from Caltech. She is the 2000 winner of the Annie J. Cannon Award in Astronomy and the Vainu Bappu Gold Medal of Astronomical Society of India for 2000 (awarded 2002). In 2019 she was selected to become a fellow of the American Astronomical Society. 

Weinberger studies the formation of planets, using observational methods such as ultra-high spatial-resolution imaging using advanced instrumentation on the ground and in space including the Hubble Space Telescope. Her research focuses on disks surrounding nearby stars in order to understand the conditions for the birth of new planets.

Selected publications

"Debris Disks Around Nearby Stars with Circumstellar Gas," Roberge, A. & Weinberger, A. J. 2008, ApJ, in press (astro-ph/arXiv:0711.4561)
"Complex Organic Materials in the Circumstellar Disk of HR 4796A," Debes, J. H., Weinberger, A. J. & Schneider, G. 2007, Astrophysical Journal Letters., 673,L191
"Stabilization of the disk around Beta Pictoris by extremely carbon-rich gas," Roberge, A., Feldman, P. D., Weinberger, A. J., Deleuil, M., & Bouret, J.-C. 2006, Nature, 441, 724
"Evolution of Circumstellar Disks Around Normal Stars: Placing Our Solar System in Context," Meyer, M. R., Backman, D. E., Weinberger, A. J. & Wyatt, M. C. 2006, in Protostars and Planets V (University of Arizona Press: Tucson), Ed. B. Reipurth, D. Jewitt & K. Keil

References

Living people
Year of birth missing (living people)
American astrophysicists
American women astronomers
21st-century American astronomers
Recipients of the Annie J. Cannon Award in Astronomy
Fellows of the American Astronomical Society